The Ladder at Devils Tower was first constructed and used in 1893 by William Rogers and Willard Ripley to publicly ascend Devil's Tower. Two years later Roger's wife Linnie ascended the tower via the ladder, one of a total of about 215 who have used the ladder. The last use was by Babe "The Human Fly" White in 1927.

The present tower ladder consists of a series of wooden stakes connected on the outside by vertical wood planks. One end of each stake is driven sideways into a rock crevice, vertically ascending the southeast side of the tower. Attached with nails and/or baling wire to the other end of the stakes are 12-inch lengths of 1 x 4 - inch lumber. The ladder ascends from about 100 feet above the ground to the summit, and is about 170 feet long. Because of its small scale in comparison to the tower, it is very difficult to see in modern photographs, and visitors to the tower usually must view it through a telescope. The lowest 100 feet were removed in the 1930s as a safety measure. The remaining ladder was restored in 1972.

See also
Entrance Road-Devils Tower National Monument
Entrance Station-Devils Tower National Monument
Old Headquarters Area Historic District

References

External links
National Park Service Devils Tower First Fifty Years - Stake Ladder
 at the National Park Service's NRHP database
Devils Tower Ladder at the Wyoming State Historic Preservation Office

National Register of Historic Places in Devils Tower National Monument
Buildings and structures in Crook County, Wyoming
Ladders
Stairways in the United States
Stairways on the National Register of Historic Places
Transportation buildings and structures on the National Register of Historic Places in Wyoming
1893 establishments in Wyoming